The Way I Am is the international debut album by Swedish singer-songwriter Ana Johnsson and the second studio album overall. It was released on August 9, 2004, by Bonnier Amigo and Sony BMG. The album was the 2005 winner of the European Border Breakers Award for Sweden.

It is composed of the first seven songs of the first album, Cuz I Can, plus four new songs. The album spawned three singles: "We Are", which was the theme song from the Spider-Man 2 movie, and two songs co-written by Johnsson, "Don't Cry for Pain" and "Coz I Can", the latter making it to the top 5 most popular songs in Japan at the time of its release.

In addition to reaching the top 20 in Germany and Switzerland, The Way I Am was a commercial success in Japan, where it debuted at number four and went on to sell over 150,000 copies, receiving a Gold certification. It sold 300,000 copies worldwide.

Track listings

Standard album

Includes the videos:
On the road with... Ana Johnsson
We Are [music video] (without the Spider-Man 2 scenes)

Japanese version (CD/DVD)
CD
"We Are" – 3:57
"Don't Cry for Pain" – 3:48
"The Way I Am" – 3:32
"I'm Stupid" – 3:48
"Life" – 3:08
"6 Feet Under" – 3:45
"Coz I Can" – 3:03
"Crest of the Wave" – 4:50
"L.A." – 3:44
"Now It's Gone" – 3:43
"Here I Go Again" – 3:27
"Black Hole" [bonus track] – 3:58

DVD
"We Are" [video]
On the Road with Ana Johnsson (photo session in Japan) [video]

Japanese special edition 2CD
CD 1
As the regular CD.

CD 2

Includes the videos:
"Coz I Can"
"Don't Cry for Pain"

Note: The CD 2 tracks are from Johnsson's first album Cuz I Can.

Singles

Charts

1: The International Album Chart excludes Japanese artists. Peak position in parentheses is for the full album chart. The album peaked at No. 24 at the Japanese Oricon International Albums of 2004.

Credits

Production

Vocals, backing vocals: Ana Johnsson
Producer, mixer, instruments – Leif Larson
Producer, mixer, instruments – Marcus Black
Producer, mixer, instruments, arranged, recorder – Ghost
Producer, mixer, instruments, additional vocals – Mikael Nord Andersson, Martin Hansen
Producer, guitar – Max Martin, Johan Brorson, Christian Nilsson
Producer, mixer, arranged, keyboards, programming, backing vocals – Jörgen Elofsson
Producer, mixer, arranged, instruments – Kalle Engstrom, Carlk Falk
Producer, arranged, guitar, bass guitar, drums, programming – Mathias Venge
Mixer, – Stefan Glaumann
Mixer, – Bo Reimer
programming – Peter Wennerberg
Mastered by – Björn Engelmann at Cutting Room Studios

Additional musicians
Drums – Nicci Notini Wallin, Sank, Lars Morten, Alar Suurna
Drums, bass guitar – Olle Dahkstedt
Drums, percussion – Christer Jansson
Guitar, bass guitar – Ola Gustavsson
Guitar – Staffan Astner
Guitar – Mattias Blomdahl
Bass guitar – Thomas Lindberg
Bass guitar – Stefan Olsson
Strings – Stockholm Session Strings
Strings arranged and conducted by – Rutger Gunnarsson
Background vocals – Jurl, Didrik Thott, Andreas Carlsson

Artwork

Photography by – Ralf Strathmann
Artwork by – Christian Bagush, dangerous. Berlin

Release history

References

Ana Johnsson albums
2004 debut albums
Albums produced by Ghost (production team)
Sony BMG albums
European Border Breakers Award-winning albums